Yuri Cherednik (born 25 June 1966) is a Russian former volleyball player who competed for the Soviet Union in the 1988 Summer Olympics and for the Unified Team in the 1992 Summer Olympics. He is 203 cm tall. Later he was part of the Russia men's national volleyball team. He played for Lube Treia Italy.

Biography
Cherednik was born at Chişinău and debuted in 1983 for Motorist Leningrad. 
In 1988 he was part of the Soviet team which won the silver medal in the Olympic tournament. He played four matches.

Four years later he finished seventh with the Unified Team in the 1992 Olympic tournament. With the Soviet (or Unified Team) national team he won also a World Cup in 1991, the European Championships of 1991 and a bronze medal in the 1990 Championship.

Cherednik played in Italy from 1992 with Centromatic Prato (winning the title of MVP of Italy's A1 League that year). He subsequently played for Macerata, Bologna, Ferrara and others, before returning to Russia in 2006, where he concluded his playing career in 2007 with the Spartak St. Petersburg.

References

External links
Complete career statistics 
 profile

1966 births
Living people
Sportspeople from Chișinău
Russian men's volleyball players
Soviet men's volleyball players
Olympic volleyball players of the Soviet Union
Olympic volleyball players of the Unified Team
Volleyball players at the 1988 Summer Olympics
Volleyball players at the 1992 Summer Olympics
Olympic silver medalists for the Soviet Union
Russian volleyball coaches
Olympic medalists in volleyball
Medalists at the 1988 Summer Olympics